Randy Fasani (born September 18, 1978) is a former professional American football quarterback.

High school career
Fasani started his football days at Del Oro High School in Loomis, California.  He finished his high school career with 5,299 passing yards and 53 touchdowns, while rushing for 654 yards and 16 TDs.  Fasani was lauded by many as the top QB and #1 recruit in the nation, including Parade and USA Today.  He was named to several All-America teams.

College career
Randy Fasani played college football at Stanford University, where he was the starting quarterback his last two years.  After redshirting as a true freshman, he played as a goal-line quarterback and tight end the next season.  During the 1999 season, he played inside linebacker as well as quarterback, and made honorable mention on the Academic All-Pac-10 team.  He started eight games his junior year, and finished the season with 1,400 passing yards, eleven touchdowns, and six interceptions.  He also rushed for 123 yards and two touchdowns.  He finished his college career with an honorable mention on the All-Pac 10 team, passing for 1,479 yards, 13 touchdowns and four interceptions.

NFL career
Fasani was selected in the fifth round of the 2002 NFL Draft by the Carolina Panthers.  He played in four games, going 15-44, 171 yards, 0 TDs and 4 INTs, while rushing for 95 yards. He made his first and only NFL start on October 27 against the Tampa Bay Buccaneers, going 5-18 for 47 yards, no touchdowns, and three interceptions. His performance resulted in the dubious passer rating of 0.0.

He later signed with the Buffalo Bills and New York Jets, but did not play in any regular season games.

After football
Following football, Fasani worked as a police officer in Visalia, California and Roseville, California. He was the varsity head coach for the Ripon Christian High School football team in Ripon, California. Since 2009, he has worked as a field sales representative for Sierra Gold Nurseries.  In 2020, he returned to the Del Oro High School football staff as the quarterbacks coach.

References

1978 births
Living people
American football quarterbacks
Carolina Panthers players
Buffalo Bills players
New York Jets players
Stanford Cardinal football players
American people of Italian descent
Sportspeople from Roseville, California
Players of American football from Sacramento, California
People from Loomis, California